Henrik Brockmann (born Henrik Aalborg Brockmann; 24 November 1967) is a Danish heavy metal singer.  He started singing at the age of 13 in local school bands. He released his first album 1992 with the Danish band Royal Hunt and was replaced 1994 by DC Cooper.

Discography
Lead vocals on:

Royal Hunt
Land of Broken Hearts (1992)
The Maxi EP (1993)
Clown in the Mirror (1993)

Missing Tide
Follow The Dreamer (2009)

Additional backing vocals on:
Andre Andersen – Changing skin (1998)
Andre Andersen – "1000 miles away" (single) (1998)
Cornerstone – Arrival (2000) 
Royal Hunt – Collision Course... Paradox 2 (2008)
Royal Hunt – X (2010)
Stamina – Two of a Kind (2010)

References

External links
Official website of Royal Hunt

1967 births
Living people
Danish heavy metal singers
English-language singers from Denmark
20th-century Danish male singers
21st-century Danish male singers
Royal Hunt members
Evil Masquerade members